The Taking of Flight 847: The Uli Derickson Story (also known as The Flight) is a 1988 American made-for-television drama film based on the actual hijacking of TWA Flight 847 as seen through the eyes of flight purser Uli Derickson, the chief flight attendant. Derickson herself acted as a consultant for the film. The film was directed by Paul Wendkos and showcases the first 48 hours of the hijacking until Derickson's liberation.

Synopsis 
Passengers gather at Ellinikon International Airport to board TWA Flight 847, which has just arrived from Cairo for its continuing flight to Rome's Fiumicino Airport. After the aircraft leaves Athens, two passengers, "Castro" and Saiid, brandish pistols and hand grenades and take over the plane. Derickson is forced at gunpoint to the flight deck door, where she realizes neither of the two hijackers speak English, but one speaks her native German.  A third, English-speaking hijacker, Ali Atwa, was due to board with Castro and Saiid, but missed the flight in Athens.  She is able to communicate the hijackers' demands and the aircraft is first ordered to re-route to Algiers.

Due to a lack of fuel for the journey, the hijackers settle on Beirut, which will also nearly exhaust their fuel supply.  Beirut Airport initially refuses to allow the plane to land, but the flight crew insists there is no alternative and proceeds to land.  There, a US Navy diver, Robert Stethem, and the flight engineer are beaten until Beirut authorities approve the refueling of the aircraft.  Several passengers are freed after Uli advises the hijackers that less passengers means the aircraft could taken on more fuel and fly farther.

The plane then departs for Algiers, during which time Castro pressures Uli into identifying Jewish passengers onboard.  When she refuses, she is forced to read aloud the names of all passports collected, and Castro identifies names he believes are of Jewish descent.  Uli instructs each of these individuals to stand, and are later directed to the rear of the aircraft where Castro scolds them.  The plane arrives in Algiers, where more hostages are released. As TWA was not a regular carrier at this airport, Algerian airport authorities refuse to fuel the jet without payment.  Uli provides her own Shell credit card to pay for the fuel in hopes of avoiding further retaliation from the hijackers against the passengers.

After a tip-off of an impending US strike on the aircraft, 847 departs again for Beirut, during which time Stethem and another passenger are beaten.  Derickson is able to calm the hijackers by singing them a folk song. Again, Beirut refuses to clear 847 to land, and another passenger is beaten in retaliation, during which time Uli steps in to stop the hijacker.  Beirut finally relents and allows 847 to land.  After coming to a stop on the tarmac, Stethem is murdered and thrown from the forward exit.  Additional hijackers board the aircraft, and the passengers with Jewish-sounding names, along with other passengers with US military credentials, are removed from the airplane and moved to another location in Beirut.  Flight 847 remains in Beirut until early morning, when news of another planned attack to free the aircraft is relayed to the hijackers.

The airliner departs for Algiers, where authorities coordinate Ali Atwa's release to the hijackers.  Castro then frees Uli, who ultimately cannot accept her freedom while leaving the others onboard.  She convinces one of the newer hijackers, who has taken on an authoritative role onboard, to free the remaining women - including the flight attendants.  While Flight 847 will later depart for Beirut where the aircraft and hostages will remain for two weeks, the film moves from showing Uli's liberation to her being at her home in the United States, where she is tying a yellow ribbon to the tree in front of her home with her son.  She later watches the news report of the remaining hostages being freed in Beirut with her husband.

Cast

Releases 
The film was released on television on May 2, 1988. It was later released on home video in the United States in 1990, in both VHS and LaserDisc formats, by Vidmark Entertainment under an alternate title, The Flight. There were also releases of this film using its original title on VHS in several other countries, including the United Kingdom and Australia.  No official DVD or Blu-ray releases of this film were ever produced.

Nominations
In 1988, at the 40th Primetime Emmy Awards, the film received five Emmy nominations: for Outstanding Television Movie; Outstanding Directing for a Limited Series, Movie, or Dramatic Special; Outstanding Makeup for a Limited Series or Movie (Non-Prosthetic); Outstanding Single-Camera Picture Editing for a Limited Series or Movie; and David Yewdall for Outstanding Sound Editing for a Limited Series, Movie, or Special.

References

External links
 
 airodyssey.net Movie Review
 Uli Derickson – Legacy of Courage
 Top Hezbollah militant slain

American films based on actual events
Films set on airplanes
Films about aircraft hijackings
Films scored by Gil Mellé
American aviation films
1988 television films
1988 films
Films directed by Paul Wendkos
1980s English-language films
1980s American films